St. Joseph's Cove is an abandoned community in Bonne Bay, Newfoundland and Labrador.

Ghost towns in Newfoundland and Labrador